Canora may refer to:

 Canora (Edmonton), neighborhood of Edmonton, Alberta, Canada
 Canora, Saskatchewan, Canada
 Canora Beach, Canada
 Canora-Pelly, electoral district in Saskatchewan
Canora (Ukraine) , village in Ukraine.

Transportation
 Canora Airport, Canora, Saskatchewan, Canada
 Canora station (REM), passenger rail station in Montreal, Quebec, Canada
 Canora station (Saskatchewan), Canora, Saskatchewan, Canada

See also
 Kenora (disambiguation)